Technical sergeant is the name of two current and two former enlisted ranks in the United States Armed Forces, as well as in the U.S. Civil Air Patrol. Outside the United States, it is used only by the Philippine Army, Philippine Air Force and the Philippine Marine Corps.

Philippines
The rank of technical sergeant is used by the Armed Forces of the Philippines. It is a non-commissioned officer rank used by Philippine Army, Philippine Air Force and Philippine Marine Corps (under the Philippine Navy). The rank stands above the rank of Staff sergeant and below Master sergeant.

United States
Technical sergeant is a rank in the United States Air Force, United States Space Force, and Civil Air Patrol. It is a former rank in the United States Army and United States Marine Corps.

Army
The rank of technical sergeant existed from after World War I until 1948 when the rank was renamed sergeant first class. In 1920 the army combined several battalion/squadron level "staff" NCO ranks, including battalion quartermaster sergeant, battalion supply sergeant, ordnance sergeant, hospital sergeant, three grades of master sergeant (junior grade), and six additional senior-level technical and specialist ranks into the new technical sergeant rank. In 1944 when rifle squad leaders became staff sergeants, platoon sergeants were promoted to technical sergeants. In 1948 the army renamed technical sergeant as sergeant first class.

Marine Corps
Technical sergeant was a rank in the United States Marine Corps until 1958. From 1941 until 1946, the rank was equivalent to grade 2, ranking with gunnery sergeant and other technical ranks. From 1947 until 1958, the rank was reclassified as E-6 and became the sole rank in this grade. The rank was renamed gunnery sergeant and elevated to E-7 after the reorganization of grades in 1959.

Air Force
Technical sergeant, "tech sgt" or "TSgt" in informal parlance, is the sixth enlisted rank (pay grade E-6) in the U.S. Air Force, just above staff sergeant and below master sergeant. A technical sergeant is a noncommissioned officer and abbreviated as TSgt (with no period in official USAF and other military correspondence). Official terms of address are "technical sergeant" or "sergeant", although many use "tech sergeant" in informal situations.

Civil Air Patrol
The Civil Air Patrol (CAP), a non-profit corporation Congressionally chartered to operate as the civilian auxiliary of the U.S. Air Force, has a quasi-military structure which includes the rank of technical sergeant. The grade of technical sergeant is above staff sergeant and beneath master sergeant. Former military enlisted personnel who held the rank of technical sergeant in the United States Armed Forces may retain that rank as members of the CAP.

Space Force
On February 1, 2021, the United States Space Force announced its permanent rank structure, establishing the grade of technical sergeant as its permanent E-6 grade. This continued its usage from the Air Force. The grade of technical sergeant is above sergeant and beneath master sergeant.

See also
United States military pay
United States Air Force enlisted rank insignia
United States Army enlisted rank insignia of World War I
United States Army enlisted rank insignia of World War II

References

Enlisted ranks of the United States Air Force
Enlisted ranks of the United States Space Force
Military ranks of the United States Army
Air force ranks
United States military enlisted ranks